The Old Ferry Boat Inn is a pub in Holywell, Cambridgeshire, England. It is situated on the banks of the River Great Ouse.

The Old Ferry Boat Inn was established in 560. It claims to be the oldest pub in England.

Alleged haunting 
The Old Ferry Boat Inn is believed to house a ghost named Juliet Tewsley. She is rumoured to rise every year on the anniversary of her death. Tewsley was a local girl who fell in love with Tom Zaul in the 11th century. Tom was not in love with Juliet in return, so she hanged herself on 17 March 1050.

There is a stone slab inside the pub dedicated to Tewsley. Staff reportedly avoid walking over the grave, as it is believed to cause frightening apparitions. Guests are also advised not to do so.

References

Pubs in Cambridgeshire
Reportedly haunted locations in the East of England